Elena Bogdan (born 28 March 1992) is a professional tennis player from Romania.

On 18 July 2011, she achieved her career-high singles ranking of world No. 151. On 8 June 2015, she peaked at No. 79 in the WTA doubles rankings.

Junior career
At the 2008 French Open, she reached the final of the girls' singles tournament but lost to Simona Halep in three sets.
In 2009, she won the French Open girls' doubles title, partnering Noppawan Lertcheewakarn of Thailand. In the final, they beat Tímea Babos and Heather Watson, in three sets.

WTA career finals

Doubles: 1 (1 title)

ITF Circuit finals

Singles: 8 (4 titles, 4 runner–ups)

Doubles: 45 (22 titles, 23 runner–ups)

External links
 
 

Romanian female tennis players
1992 births
Living people
Sportspeople from Craiova
Grand Slam (tennis) champions in girls' doubles
French Open junior champions